El Abadia District is a district of Aïn Defla Province, Algeria.

Municipalities
The district is further divided into three municipalities.
El Abadia
Tacheta Zougagha
Aïn Bouyahia

Districts of Aïn Defla Province